Integrity Records is an English independent record label based in Bedford, England. The label was founded in the early 1990s and specialises in discovering new bands in the rock/indie/punk genres.

History
The first release on the label was 1996 single 'Ghost Island' by The Traceys, but the label is most notable for signing bands such as Miss Black America and Million Dead, whose vocalist Frank Turner went on to forge a successful solo career.

John Peel was a great supporter of the label and played the vast majority of their releases on his BBC Radio 1 show. In 2002, 5 Integrity releases (including B-sides) appeared in Peel's annual Festive Fifty.

Over the years, Integrity has also been the UK home for American artists such as Katastrophy Wife and Meow Meow.

In December 2005 Integrity released a single by London-based noiseniks October All Over, after which the label entered a hiatus.

In March 2011, the label announced via social media feeds that it was active again and welcomed two new signings.  A redesigned official website then confirmed those signings as Travis + Julie from Nashville, Tennessee and Birmingham dream-indie duo Pet Dog Storm.  Travis + Julie's single Osmosis preceded their album Moon Girl whilst Pet Dog Storm released debut single Time to Fly from their album Beautiful is Down.

In June 2012 the label announced the signing of Scottish art-rockers Miniature Dinosaurs, followed by a single "Lemonade" in July and the "Turn It On EP" in November. Their roster grew further with the addition of Birmingham alt pop band TheLights with the single "Days Don't Get Me Far Enough Away".

November 2012 saw a deal announced with Futur Primitif, the new project of Daniel Lefkowitz, former member of American indie-folk band The Low Anthem, followed by the release of two singles, Nuclear Shockwave and Digital Space, and the album Machineteeth.

In 2013 the label signed Valentiine, an all-girl trio from Melbourne, Australia, and released singles Love Like and Chucky, before their debut album Valentiine in July  2013, said by Time Out London to be "one of the best grunge records since the death of Kurt Cobain".

Later in the year, the label signed both Horse Party and Wolverhampton based indie-electronica outfit Silhouettes, with the latter releasing their debut single "Gold Tag" in November 2013, and debut album "Ever Moving Happiness Machines" in January 2014.  Horse Party, from Bury St Edmunds, released singles What Do You Need and Clarion Call alongside album Cover Your Eyes, and were chosen by BBC Introducing to play the 2014 Latitude Festival.

Integrity Records was named Best Independent Record Label 2014 in the Love Music Magazine annual awards.

In 2015 Integrity Publishing Ltd, a sister company to Integrity Records but focussed on music publishing, was born.

During 2016 two new bands join the Integrity label roster. Manchester's Ghosts of Social Networks' debut single Love Potion was heard several times on BBC 6 Music and Amazing Radio, and followed by several singles through 2016 and 2017. Mannequin Death Squad, from Melbourne, released debut single Sick and 5-track mini-album Eat Hate Regurgitate alongside UK tours in September 2016 and September 2017.

2018 saw the label look to the Nordics for musical inspiration with album and single releases by Danish dream-folk artist MALMØ (We Come From The Stars) and Greenlandic singer-songwriter Simon Lynge (Deep Snow), along with an award of Label of the Year 2018 in the LWM Music Blog awards.

2019's key releases included an album by Copenhagen based folk/Americana artist Ida Wenøe (The Things We Don't Know Yet) and singles by UK collaborators Tribes of Europe & Barbara Stretch.

Releases
Antihero - Stravinsky Gave Me Nightmares - CD single, 
Miss Black America - God Bless Miss Black America - CD album, 
Miss Black America - Miss Black America (edit) - CD and 7" single, 
Antihero - Rolling Stones T-Shirt - CD single, 
Miss Black America - Talk Hard - CD and 7" single, 
Miss Black America - Infinite Chinese Box - CD and 7" single, 
Plutonik - Prime Numbers - CD and vinyl album, 
Plutonik - Londinium - CD and 12" single, 
Plutonik - Sitting on Top of the World - CD and 12" single, 
The Joylanders - Yesterday's Happenings - 7" single
The Traceys - Ghost Island - CD and 7" single, 
Million Dead - Smiling at Strangers on Trains - CD single, 
Katastrophy Wife - Liberty Belle - CD  and 7" single, 
Million Dead - Breaking the Back - CD and 7" single, 
Million Dead - A Song To Ruin - CD album, 
Reuben - Stuck In My Throat - CD and 7" single, 
Million Dead - I Am The Party - CD and 7" single, 
Katastrophy Wife - Blue Valient / Emit Time - CD single, 
Meow Meow - Cracked - CD single 
Katastrophy Wife - All Kneel - CD album, 
Meow Meow - Sick Fixation - CD single, 
Meow Meow - Snow Gas Bones - CD album, 
October All Over - 2005BC - CD single, 
Travis + Julie - Osmosis - download single, 
Pet Dog Storm - Time to Fly - download single, 
Pet Dog Storm - Beautiful Is Down - CD and download album, 
Miniature Dinosaurs - Lemonade - download single, 
Miniature Dinosaurs - Turn It On EP - CD EP, 
Futur Primitif - Nuclear Shockwave - download single, 
Futur Primitif - Machineteeth - CD and download album, 
Valentiine - Love Like - download single, 
Futur Primitif - Digital Space - download single, 
Valentiine - Chucky - download single, 
Valentiine - Valentiine - CD and download album, 
Futur Primitif - Time - download single, 23 August 2013
TheLights - Dust & Stone - download single, 28 October 2013
Horse Party - What Do You Need - download single, 11 November 2013
Silhouettes - Gold Tag - download single, 25 November 2013
Valentiine - Animal - download single, 6 January 2014
Horse Party - Cover Your Eyes - CD and download album, 17 April 2014
Horse Party - Clarion Call - download single, 17 April 2014
Silhouettes - Prufrock's Dream - download single, 19 May 2014
Silhouettes - Ever Moving Happiness Machines - CD and download album, 2 June 2014
Silhouettes - Sacrifice - download single, 10 November 2014
Valentiine - Beauty Lies - download single, 15 December 2014
Ghosts of Social Networks - Love Potion/Mockingbirds - download single,6 May 2016
Mannequin Death Squad - Sick - download single, 10 June 2016
Mannequin Death Squad - Eat Hate Regurgitate - CD and download mini-album, 9 September 2016
Ghosts of Social Networks - Comeback Kid - download single, 21 October 2016
Ghosts of Social Networks - No Going Back - download single, 10 February 2017
Ghosts of Social Networks - Outside The Wheel - download single, 12 May 2017
Mannequin Death Squad - Van Gogh - download single, 23 June 2017
Ghosts of Social Networks - If This Isn't Love - download single, 21 July 2017
MALMØ - You - download single, 20 October 2017
MALMØ - We Come From The Stars - download single, 2 March 2018
MALMØ - We Come From The Stars - CD and download album, 4 May 2018
Simon Lynge  - Age of Distraction - download single, 7 September 2018
MALMØ - The Way (feat. Eivør) - download single, 28 September 2018
Simon Lynge - Paper Thin, download single, 9 November 2018
Simon Lynge - Deep Snow - CD, vinyl and download album, 23 November 2018
MALMØ - Frostbite - download single, 1 February 2019
Mannequin Death Squad - Blue - download single, 14 February 2019
Ida Wenøe – Another Kind of Love - download single, 1 March 2019
Ida Wenøe - The Things We Don’t Know Yet - CD, vinyl & download album, 12 April 2019
Tribes of Europe & Barbara Stretch - You Don't Speak For Me - CD & download single, 21 June 2019
Ida Wenøe - Change Me A Little - download single, 13 September 2019
MALMØ - Bleed Me Dry - download single, 25 October 2019
Tribes of Europe & Barbara Stretch - It’s A Lovely Day Tomorrow - CD & download single, 6 December 2019
Ida Wenøe - Värmeland - download single, 31 January 2020

References

External links
Official Website

English record labels
British independent record labels